Parque de los Venados is a station on Line 12 of the Mexico City Metro. The station is located between Zapata and  Eje Central. It was opened on 30 October 2012 as a part of the first stretch of Line 12 between Mixcoac and Tláhuac and it is built underground.

Name and pictogram
The station's name originates from a nearby park, commonly known as Parque de los Venados (Park of the Deer) on account of the deer statues located there, but which was originally named Parque Francisco Villa in honor of the eponymous Mexican revolutionary leader. The station's pictogram depicts two deers, representing the aforementioned statues located at the adjacent park.

General information
The station is located south of the city center, at the intersection between Eje 7 Sur Municipio Libre and Calle Uxmal in the Benito Juárez municipality. The municipality's seat is just next to the station and two of the station entrances are located in the plaza next to the government building.

During the line's construction, the remains of people believed to be of the Aztecs were found at the station site.

Museo de la Radio
The Parque de los Venados station features the Museo de la Radio (Radio Museum), inaugurated in October 2018. The museum features more than ten thousand items related to the radio its culture and history, ranging from audiovisual material and memorabilia to a letter from Porfirio Díaz.

Ridership

Entrances
Northwest: Eje 7 Sur Municipio Libre and Uxmal street, Santa Cruz Atoyac
Southwest: Eje 7 Sur Municipio Libre and Uxmal street, Col. Residencial Emperadores
Northeast: Eje 7 Sur Municipio Libre and Uxmal street, Santa Cruz Atoyac

References

External links 
 
 
 Photo of tunnel boring machine breakthrough at Parque de los Venados station

Parque de los Venados
Railway stations opened in 2012
2012 establishments in Mexico
Mexico City Metro stations in Benito Juárez, Mexico City
Accessible Mexico City Metro stations